Jessica Brooke Capshaw (born August 9, 1976) is an American actress known for her roles as Jamie Stringer in The Practice, and as Arizona Robbins on the ABC medical drama Grey's Anatomy.

Early life
Capshaw was born on August 9, 1976, in Columbia, Missouri, the daughter of actress and producer Kate Capshaw and Robert Capshaw, a sales manager, marketing director, business executive and high school principal. She is the stepdaughter of director Steven Spielberg, whom her mother married when Capshaw was 15.

Capshaw graduated from Harvard-Westlake School in Los Angeles in 1994, then attended Brown University, where she was in productions of Arcadia and Cat on a Hot Tin Roof. She graduated in 1998 with a Bachelor of Arts in English literature. During summers, she attended classes at the Royal Academy of Dramatic Arts (RADA) in London, where she appeared as Puck in a production of A Midsummer Night's Dream.

Career
Capshaw had a minor role in the drama The Locusts (1997), co-starring her mother, at age 19, then appeared in Adam Rifkin's independent film Denial (1998). She played Dorothy Wheeler in the slasher film Valentine (2001), had a minor role in Minority Report (2002), then a lead role in Edward Burns's The Groomsmen (2006).

In 2009, Capshaw became a regular on the medical drama Grey's Anatomy. It was announced in December 2008 that she would join the cast as pediatric surgeon Arizona Robbins for a multi-episode arc. Initially scheduled to appear in only three episodes of the show's fifth season, series creator Shonda Rhimes extended her contract to appear in all of the season's remaining episodes, and she became a series regular in the sixth season.

Capshaw was established as a love interest for orthopedic surgery resident Callie Torres (Sara Ramirez). Rhimes was pleased with the chemistry between them, saying that the addition of Capshaw to the cast was an element of the season of which she was most proud: "I love Jessica Capshaw, and when I say love I mean love. She couldn't be a more wonderful person, and I feel like the chemistry Arizona and Callie have feels like the Meredith and Derek chemistry to me. I find them delightful to watch." Initial media reaction was positive. Matt Mitovich of TV Guide called Capshaw a "fan favorite", and Chris Monfette of IGN praised the addition of "fresh, new characters" such as Robbins over the course of the season.

In March 2018 Capshaw left Grey’s Anatomy, with the producers citing creative reasons. She posted a statement on Twitter highlighting her character's significance: "She was one of the first members of the LGBTQ community to be represented in a series regular role on network television. Her impact on the world is permanent and forever."

Personal life
Capshaw is married to Christopher Gavigan. They have four children.

In 2010, she posed nude for the May issue of Allure magazine.

Filmography

Film

Television

References

External links
 
 

1976 births
Living people
Alumni of RADA
American film actresses
American television actresses
Brown University alumni
Actresses from California
Harvard-Westlake School alumni
20th-century American actresses
21st-century American actresses
Actors from Columbia, Missouri
Actresses from Missouri